James Theodoric David (Hatchet, Rebel) (December 2, 1927 – July 29, 2007) was an American football defensive back for the Detroit Lions (1952–1959) in the National Football League. He attended Colorado A&M, now known as Colorado State University.

College career
Jim David played as an offensive and defensive halfback, linebacker, and end for Colorado A&M from 1949 to 1951. In his senior year, he was ranked second in the nation in receptions. During his college career, David lettered in both football and baseball. Prior to attending college, he served in the Army as a staff sergeant in the infantry, which included a tour-of-duty in Europe.

David was inducted to the Colorado State University Athletics Hall of Fame in 1989.

Professional career
Jim David was a member of three Detroit Lions World Championship teams in the 1950s, and is widely regarded as one of the greatest players in Detroit history. The six-time Pro Bowler (1955–60) roamed in the Lions secondary, often referred to as "Chris' Crew", for eight seasons (1952–59) after being drafted out of Colorado A&M. David's teammates in that secondary included Hall of Famers Jack Christiansen and Yale Lary, and they were also joined by Bob Smith and Karl Karilivacz. He ended his career with 36 interceptions, which still ranks fifth in Lions' history, and he recorded a season-high of seven interceptions three times (1952, 1954 and 1956).

Known around the league as "The Hatchet", David was a major contributor on an instrumental Lions' defense that helped Detroit's championship teams in 1952, 1953 and 1957. Standing only 5-11 and weighing a little over 170 pounds, he earned the nickname "Hatchet" in 1953 when, in successive games, he delivered devastating tackles that knocked future Hall of Famers Y. A. Tittle (San Francisco 49ers) and Tom Fears (Los Angeles Rams), out of both games.

After retiring from the Lions, David immediately entered the pro coaching ranks - joining the Los Angeles Rams' coaching staff as defensive backs coach from 1960 to 1962. Jim later became the Rams' chief talent scout in 1963. He then joined Jack Christiansen's San Francisco 49ers coaching staff, as secondary coach, from 1964 to 1966. In 1967, another former Lions' teammate and Hall of Famer, Joe Schmidt, hired David to help run the Lions' defense. He served in that capacity for six seasons from 1967 to 1972. Among the star players he coached was Hall of Famer Lem Barney, whom David presented during his Pro Football Hall of Fame enshrinement in 1992.

References

External links

1927 births
2007 deaths
American football defensive backs
Colorado State Rams football players
Detroit Lions players
Western Conference Pro Bowl players
Sportspeople from Florence, South Carolina
Players of American football from South Carolina
United States Army non-commissioned officers